Ma' Rosa is a 2016 Filipino drama film directed by Brillante Mendoza. It was selected to compete for the Palme d'Or at the 2016 Cannes Film Festival. At Cannes, Jaclyn Jose won the award for Best Actress. It was selected as the Filipino entry for the Best Foreign Language Film at the 89th Academy Awards but it was not nominated.

Plot
Rosa (Jaclyn Jose) is married to Nestor (Julio Diaz) with whom she has three children. Rosa's family runs a sari-sari store in a neighborhood in Manila. The income from the small convenience store business alone isn't enough to meet the family's daily needs, so illegal drugs particularly "ice" or crystal meth are also sold at Rosa's store. One day police officers arrest Rosa and Nestor for selling drugs and ask them for "bail money" or a bribe for the couple's release. Rosa's children, left on their own to deal with the struggles of daily life, find a way to free their detained parents.

Cast
 Jaclyn Jose as Rosa Reyes
 Julio Diaz as Nestor Reyes
 Baron Geisler as Sumpay
 Jomari Angeles as Erwin Reyes
 Neil Ryan Sese as Olivarez
 Mercedes Cabral as Linda
 Andi Eigenmann as Raquel Reyes
 Mark Anthony Fernandez as Castor
 Felix Roco as Jackson Reyes
 Mon Confiado as Sanchez
 Maria Isabel Lopez as Tilde
 Kristoffer King as Jomar

Production
Director Brillante Mendoza decided to make the film to tackle the issue of small-scale drug selling in the Philippines which he says is really happening in the country and described the situation as alarming. Mendoza noted that the concept of corruption which is a subject of the film appeals to a worldwide audience since he says that corruption is happening in many different countries on a different scale.

Ma' Rosa was originally titled Palit Ulo. The film was shot in Mandaluyong during the rainy season of 2015 and was supported by French distributor firm, Film Distribution.

Critical reception
The film holds 78% rating on Rotten Tomatoes. Maggie Lee of Variety reviewed the film and said "Boasting a simple, coherent plot shot with real-time, handheld verismo, it’s a work of understated confidence that will not disappoint his festival acolytes, but probably won’t win many new converts". Peter Bradshaw of The Guardian stated that "Ma'Rosa is made with control and clarity, a narrative purpose which is held on to despite an apparently aimless docu-style, and a clear sense of jeopardy".

Accolades

See also
 List of submissions to the 89th Academy Awards for Best Foreign Language Film
 List of Philippine submissions for the Academy Award for Best Foreign Language Film

References

External links

2016 films
2016 drama films
Philippine drama films
Films directed by Brillante Mendoza
Films about poverty
Films about the illegal drug trade
Films set in Metro Manila
Filipino-language films